"Castaway" is a song recorded by American country music group Zac Brown Band. It was released as the sixth single from the band's fourth studio album, Jekyll + Hyde, on April 25, 2016.  The song was written by Zac Brown, Coy Bowles, John Driskell Hopkins, Wyatt Durrette and Niko Moon.

Content
The song is an upbeat, reggae-influenced tune about a man who wants to relax on a beach as a "castaway".

Critical reception
An uncredited review from Taste of Country was positive, saying that "The textured vocals are much more compelling than anything from the arrangement, although it’s pretty tough not to enjoy the groove the Zac Brown Band band are laying down in 'Castaway.' It’s actually been some time since ZBB released an island-flavored single, and the timing couldn’t be better for this brand of country music."

Personnel
From Jekyll + Hyde liner notes.

Musical
 Coy Bowles – electric guitar
 Zac Brown – lead vocals, acoustic guitar
 Clay Cook – background vocals, Hammond organ, ukulele
 Jimmy DeMartini – background vocals, violin
 Chris Fryar – drums
 John Driskell Hopkins – background vocals, ukulele
 Matt Mangano – bass guitar, acoustic bass guitar
 Daniel de los Reyes – percussion

Technical
 Brandon Bell - engineering
 John Driskell Hopkins - vocal arrangement
 In the Arena Productions - production
 Andrew Scheps - mixing

Chart performance
The song has sold 200,000 copies in the US as of September 2016.

Weekly charts

Year-end charts

References

2015 songs
2016 singles
Big Machine Records singles
Republic Records singles
Songs written by John Driskell Hopkins
Songs written by Niko Moon
Songs written by Wyatt Durrette (songwriter)
Songs written by Zac Brown
Zac Brown Band songs